Senetta Yoseftal (née Punfud) (5 December 1912 – 26 July 2007) was an Israeli politician.

Background
Yoseftal was born in Germany. She joined the HaBonim movement in 1933 and worked in HeHalutz Center in Berlin from 1934 to 1938. In 1936 she married Giora Yoseftal, later a member of the Knesset, and a minister in the 9th and 10th Israeli governments. She immigrated to Mandatory Palestine in 1938 and helped found Kibbutz Galed in 1945.

She was elected to the Knesset in the 1955 election as a member of Mapai, but gave up her seat after 14 months. She also appeared in the eighth Knesset as a member of the Alignment, replacing Zvi Guershoni after his death, but did not retain her seat in the 1977 election.

In December 2004 she was asked by the Kibbutz Movement to retire from her activities. Towards the end of her life she resided in Kibbutz Galed.

Public activities
Member of Directorate of the United Kibbutz Fund, 1953–1955
Member of Organizing Committee of the Histadrut, 1956–1960
Director of Economic Department of the United Kibbutz, 1960–1962
General Secretary of the United Kibbutz, 1962–1965 and 1967–1970
Founder and Director of the Department of Absorption and Development
Chairwoman of Mekorot Water Company, 1970–1972
Director of Economic Branch of the Agriculture Association, 1974–1979
Member of Secretariat and Central Committee of the United Kibbutz Movement and member of Central Committee of the Labour Party

External links

 

1912 births
2007 deaths
Alignment (Israel) politicians
Jewish emigrants from Nazi Germany to Mandatory Palestine
Israeli civil servants
Women members of the Knesset
Jewish Israeli politicians
Kibbutz Movements secretaries
Mapai politicians
Members of the 3rd Knesset (1955–1959)
Members of the 8th Knesset (1974–1977)
People from Fürth
Spouses of Israeli politicians
20th-century Israeli women politicians